Fall Festival may refer to any festival during the fall season, such as:

Autumnfest
Mid-Autumn Festival
West Side Nut Club Fall Festival